Greatest Hits is the first greatest hits album by English singer Samantha Fox. It was released on 29 June in UK and 29 September 1992 by Jive Records in Europe. The album contains material from Fox's first four studio albums, a previously unreleased song and two non-album B-sides. An accompanying music video compilation was released on VHS on 21 September 1992.

Track listing

Album

Video

Personnel
Timmy Allen – producer
Jon Astrop – producer
Ferdi Bolland – producer
Rob Bolland – producer
John David – producer
John Durno – producer
Samantha Fox – primary artist, vocals
Adam Fuest – producer
Full Force – arranger, producer
Joe Grant – photography
Nigel Green – producer
Pete Harris – producer
Steve Lovell – producer
Ralf-René Maué – arranger, producer
Steve Power – producer
Stock Aitken Waterman – producer
Ben Wilson – cover design

References

External links
 Official website

1992 greatest hits albums
1992 video albums
Albums produced by Full Force
Albums produced by Stock Aitken Waterman
Jive Records compilation albums
Jive Records video albums
Music video compilation albums
Samantha Fox albums